In mathematics, the associated graded ring of a ring R with respect to a proper ideal I is the graded ring:
.
Similarly, if M is a left R-module, then the associated graded module is the graded module over :
.

Basic definitions and properties 
Note that this is well-defined modulo . Multiplication of inhomogeneous elements is defined by using the distributive property.

A ring or module may be related to its associated graded ring or module through the initial form map. If  for every m, then set . The initial form map is only a map of sets and generally not a homomorphism. This may not be the same as the submodule of  generated by the only initial forms of the generators of N.

A ring inherits some "good" properties from its associated graded ring.

gr of a quotient module 
Let  be left modules over a ring R and I an ideal of R. Since

(the last equality is by modular law), there is a canonical identification:

where

 Examples 

Let U be the universal enveloping algebra of a Lie algebra  over a field k; it is filtered by degree. The Poincaré–Birkhoff–Witt theorem implies that  is a polynomial ring; in fact, it is the coordinate ring .

The associated graded algebra of a Clifford algebra is an exterior algebra; i.e., a Clifford algebra degenerates to an exterior algebra.

 Generalization to multiplicative filtrations 
The associated graded can also be defined more generally for multiplicative descending filtrations of R (see also filtered ring.) Let F'' be a descending chain of ideals of the form

such that . Multiplication and the initial form map are defined as above.

See also 
 Graded (mathematics)
 Rees algebra

References

 
 
 

Ring theory